New York's 92nd State Assembly district is one of the 150 districts in the New York State Assembly. It has been represented by Democrat Mary Jane Shimsky since 2023, defeating then-incumbent Thomas Abinanti.

Geography 
District 92 is located within Westchester County. It consists of the towns of Greenburgh and Mount Pleasant.

Recent election results

2022

2020

2018

2016

2014

2012

2010

References 

92
Westchester County, New York